Ellen E. McCarthy is a United States intelligence officer who served as the Assistant Secretary of State for Intelligence and Research under Mike Pompeo during the administration of Donald Trump.

At the National Geospatial Intelligence Agency, McCarthy was COO from 2015 until 2018.  She graduated from both the University of South Carolina and University of Maryland.

References

 
 
 
 
 2017-2021.State.gov Biographies — Ellen E. McCarthy

Living people
Year of birth missing (living people)
American women diplomats
Trump administration personnel
American chief operating officers
University System of Maryland alumni
University of South Carolina alumni
United States Department of State officials